Charudatta Aphale (b early 1960s) is a kirtan performer, son of kirtan performer Govindswami Aphale. Govindswami was often referred to Aphale-buwa when he was active. And now Charudatta is referred to as Aphale-buwa, with Buwa being an honorific term. Aphale took his kirtan lessons from his parents and Pt. Sharad Gokhale, Pt. Padmakar Kulkarni, Mukundbuva Gokhale, Agashe Buva, Madhukar Khadilkar, Pt. Vijay Bakshi

Career as actor in Sangeet Natak
He started acting in Marathi Sangit Nataks (musical plays) right from his school days. He has acted in several plays like Katyar Kaljat Ghusali, Shakuntal, Saubhadra, Sanshay Kallol, Matsyagandha, Lavani Bhulali Abhangala, Atun Kirtan varun Tamasha, Ithe Oshalala Mrutyu, To Mi Navhech etc.

Family of Keertan-kaar-s
Charudatta Aphale completed B.A. with Marathi language as the principal subject; later he chose music as the main subject for his M.A. Charudatta Aphale's father, Govindswami Aphale, was among the foremost keertankaars of his day from 1950s to 1980s. 
Aphale has carried forward his family's tradition of Kirtan (a form of narration which combines spiritual and social messages with music). He has performed more than 5000 kirtans in 25 years. His kirtan performances have taken place not only in Maharashtra, but also in other states of India and even in U.S.A., Canada and Australia etc. He has also performed on several television and channels. His sister, Krantigeeta Mahabal, is also a noted keertan performer.

Charudatta Aphale's kirtans include topics like freedom fighters, religious kirtanas, and kirtanas on saints. This includes, Vasudev Balwant Phadke, Chaphekar Brothers, Rani Laxmibai,  Netaji Subhashchandra Bose, Bhagat Singh, Shivaji, Sambhaji, Bajirao I etc.

Aphale also educates young students about historic tales and especially anecdotes from the lives of Marathi saints.

Plays

Awards
He has been honoured with many awards, these include

 Patankar award of Pune Marathi Granthalay
 Gold Medal of Goa Mashel group
 Paluskar award of Akhil Bharatiya Natya Parishad
 Pune Ki Asha award 2002
 Dinanath Mangeshkar award 2003, received at the hands of the chief minister of Maharashtra.
 Balgandarv Gungaurav Puraskar

References

External links
http://www.samarthramdas400.in/eng/thankyou.php

Year of birth missing (living people)
Living people
Indian folk musicians
Place of birth missing (living people)